Eupalaestrus crassimetatarsis is a tarantula in the  genus Eupalaestrus. It was first described by Leandro Malta Borges, Andressa Paladini, and Rogério Bertanii in 2021. It is found in Paraná, Brazil and Argentina.

References

External links
Eupalaestrus crassimetatarsis at Tarantupedia 

Spiders described in 2021
Theraphosidae